Wander Gross (born December 14, 1978) is an Aruban football player. He has played for Aruba national team as a midfielder.

References

1978 births
Living people
Aruban footballers
Association football midfielders
SV Dakota players
Aruba international footballers